Vawter Hall and the Old President's House are two of the oldest buildings at Virginia State University, the oldest state-supported college for blacks in the United States. Vawter Hall was built and named in 1908 in honor of the school's late rector and authority on industrial training, Charles E. Vawter. The School was originally chartered as the Virginia Normal and Collegiate Institute in 1882, created through an agreement with the Readjuster Party to found a state-supported school of higher learning for blacks.

It was listed on the National Register of Historic Places in 1980.

References

Vawter Hall and the Old President's House  - Virginia African Heritage Program

External links
Vawter Hall in 1908

African-American history of Virginia
University and college buildings on the National Register of Historic Places in Virginia
Queen Anne architecture in Virginia
School buildings completed in 1908
Buildings and structures in Chesterfield County, Virginia
National Register of Historic Places in Chesterfield County, Virginia
1908 establishments in Virginia